Jegindø, locally known as 'Jenø', is a Danish island in the western part of the Limfjord. The island is connected with the peninsula Thyholm via a dam. The main settlement is Jegind. Until 2007, the island was part of Thyholm municipality, but now it is part of Struer municipality. The island is 6 km long and 3 km wide. Jegindø covers an area of 7,91 km2 and has 507 inhabitants (1 January 2005). There are no forests, rivers, or lakes on Jegindø.

The island has a church, a harbour and a mission house. Commercially, the main industries are fisheries, the sale of fish and mussels, and farming.

Islands in the Limfjord